Denis or Dennis Hickey (or Hickie) may refer to:

 Dennis Hickey (American football) (born 1970), general manager of the Miami Dolphins
 Dennis W. Hickey (1844–1908), Union Army soldier in the American Civil War and Medal of Honor recipient
 Dennis Walter Hickey (1914–1999), American Catholic bishop
 Denis Hickey (born 1964), Australian cricketer
 Denis Hickie (born 1976), Irish rugby player

See also
Hickey (surname)